Jean-Pierre Augert (13 January 1946 — 15 February 1976) was a French alpine skier who competed in the 1968 Winter Olympics.

References

External links
 sports-reference.com

1946 births
1976 deaths
French male alpine skiers
Olympic alpine skiers of France
Alpine skiers at the 1968 Winter Olympics